Sex & Drugs & Rock & Roll is an American sitcom created by and starring Denis Leary. The series aired on FX for a total of 20 episodes from July 16, 2015, to September 1, 2016. In September 2015, the network renewed the show for a second season, which premiered on June 30, 2016. On September 9, 2016, following the end of the second season, FX canceled the show.

Cast

Main
 Denis Leary as Johnny Rock: the former lead singer of the band 'The Heathens'
 John Corbett as Josiah 'Flash' Bacon: The former Heathens' guitarist; until the formation of The Assassins, he had a regular gig playing for Lady Gaga
 Elizabeth Gillies as Gigi Rock: the lead singer of The Assassins and Johnny's daughter
 Robert Kelly as Hector 'Bam Bam' Jimenez: the  former Heathens drummer and now The Assassins' drummer
 Elaine Hendrix as Ava Delany: the former Heathens backup singer, Johnny's longtime live-in girlfriend, and his moral compass
 John Ales as Sonny 'Rehab' Silverstien: the former Heathens' bassist and now The Assassins' bassist

Recurring
 Josh Pais as Ira Feinbaum (season 1): The Heathens former manager who kept Johnny as a client. He becomes the first manager of The Assassins.
 Callie Thorne as Cat Zakarian:  One of the former back up singers for The Heathens, Gigi's mother, and Johnny's former lover who is also a songwriter.
 Eric Sheffer Stevens as Brook Lanley (season 2): a hip rock producer.
 Rebecca Naomi Jones as Davvy O'Dell (season 2): a sexy downtown singer.
 Mark Gessner as Noah Perkins (season 2): The Assassins new manager, who takes over for Ira.

Premise
Fifty-year-old Johnny Rock (Denis Leary) was once the lead singer of The Heathens, a rising rock band from the late 1980s and early 1990s that broke up following the release of only one album, mainly due to Johnny's life of excess. 21 years later, Johnny struggles to survive in the music industry. He is given a second chance, however, when he learns that he has a 21-year-old daughter named Gigi (Elizabeth Gillies) with one of his former back up singers. Gigi moves to New York to try to make it as a musician. She comes up with a proposition: if her dad reforms The Heathens, she will replace him as lead singer, the band will change their name to The Assassins, and in return he will stay on board as lead songwriter for the band, as well as coach to Gigi. Johnny experiences the challenges of an aging rock star in a music landscape fueled by hip-hop and pop, as well as caring for someone other than himself for once with his newly found daughter now in his life.

Episodes

Season 1 (2015)

Season 2 (2016)

Soundtracks

Season 1

Sex & Drugs & Rock & Roll (Songs from the FX Original Comedy Series) is the soundtrack album for the first season of the TV series. The album was released on September 10, 2015.

Eight songs from the album were released as promotional singles; "Animal" (on July 16, 2015), "Desire" and "New York 2015" (on July 30, 2015), "Die Trying" (on August 6, 2015), "Put It on Me" (on August 27, 2015), "What's My Name" (on September 10, 2015), and "Complicated" (on September 17, 2015).

Season 2

Sex & Drugs & Rock & Roll (Songs from the FX Original Comedy Series) Season 2 is the soundtrack album for the second season of the TV series. The album was released on September 1, 2016.

Six songs from the album were released as promotional singles; "Ain't No Valentine" (on June 30, 2016), "Don't Break Me Too" (on July 14, 2016), "Just Let Me Go" (on July 28, 2016), "Raise a Hand" (on August 4, 2016), and "Already in Love" and "So Many Miles" (on August 25, 2016).

Critical reception
The first season of Sex&Drugs&Rock&Roll received mixed reviews from critics. On the review aggregate website Rotten Tomatoes, it has a rating of 59%, based on 46 reviews, with an average rating of 5.66/10. The site's critical consensus reads, "Denis Leary's Sex&Drugs&Rock&Roll feels much like the aging rocker it is trying to portray — a beloved star struggling to reach his former glory." On Metacritic, which assigns a normalized rating, the series has a score of 60 out of 100, based on 32 critics, indicating "mixed or average reviews".

References

External links
 

2010s American musical comedy television series
2010s American single-camera sitcoms
2015 American television series debuts
2016 American television series endings
English-language television shows
FX Networks original programming
Television series about dysfunctional families
Television series about fictional musicians
Television series by 20th Century Fox Television
Television shows filmed in New York City
Television shows set in New York City